Kate Hodgson (born 30 August 1985) is an English actress and photographer.

Early life
Kate Hodgson was born in Birkenhead, Merseyside in North West England.

In 2006, she graduated from Italia Conti Academy of Theatre Arts with a Degree in Acting.

Career
2008 saw Hodgson appear in the British TV serial drama Hollyoaks for Channel 4 as Jennifer Kiddle.
In 2010, she made her stage debut in Backbeat at Citizens' Theatre, Glasgow playing Cynthia Lennon. The play was an original stage adaption of the film of the same name, directed by Iain Softley.
In 2015 Hodgson starred in Murderous Injustice, a harrowing short film based on the true events of murdered immigrant Bijan Ebrahimi. The film has subsequently been added to the shortlist for the 2016 Edinburgh International Film Festival.

References

External links

Kate McDonald Photography

1985 births
Living people
Alumni of the Italia Conti Academy of Theatre Arts
English television actresses
20th-century English actresses
21st-century English actresses
Place of birth missing (living people)
People from Birkenhead
Actresses from Merseyside